Doctor and the Healer is a 1957 Italian comedy film directed by Mario Monicelli.

Plot
The young Dr. Marchetti relocates to a small mountain village in rural southern Italy. He quickly runs into trouble with Don Antonio Locoratolo, the local quack who prescribes dubious cures and potions to the naïve and superstitious populace. Don Antonio knows that his methods are fraudulent and sees Dr. Marchetti as a threat to his livelihood. Don Antonio convinces the local populace not to get vaccinated against typhoid fever. To convince the population of their continued need for him, Don Antonio arranges for an old man in the village to feign sick for several days and not improve under Dr. Marchetti's treatment, but who is miraculously "cured" during a visit by Don Antonio. Meanwhile, Pasqua, Dr. Marchetti's young assistant, has fallen in love with him, even though he does not notice her. She is given a love potion by Don Antonio's assistant, Scaraffone, but it only causes Dr. Marchetti stomach pains; Dr. Marchetti thinks Don Antonio has tried to poison him.

The mayor's sister, Mafalda, is pining after her fiancé, Corrado, who was last heard from 15 years ago, and is presumed to have been lost fighting in Russia on the Eastern Front. For years, Don Antonio has been using fraudulent fortune-telling techniques to tell her that Corrado is still alive, as she pays well for each session, even though he desires her for himself. She puts an advertisement in the paper to see if anybody has heard from or seen her fiancé. When Don Antonio tells Mafalda that her beloved Corrado is dead, she denounces him to the police as a fraud. The following day, she receives a telegram stating that Corrado is alive and will meet her at the train station. The reunion is not a happy one: Corrado is confused about details of his life, telling her he was captured "by bedouins". He says has been living 40 km away, unhappily married, and asks her for money. She gives him money and tells him to leave, and he boards the next train.

Meanwhile, Dr. Marchetti goes to the police to seek justice over the supposed "poisoning" and Mafalda's denouncement of Don Antonio, but the charges do not stick.

Don Antonio's niece Rosina is in love with a soldier from a poor family. Furious, he locks her in and forbids her from continuing the relationship. Despondent, she takes an overdose of barbiturates, forcing Don Antonio to publicly seek the doctor's help to save his niece's life. The movie ends with Dr. Marchetti administering typhoid vaccines to the local populace, while Don Antonio leaves on a train.

Cast
 Vittorio De Sica - Antonio Locoratolo
 Marcello Mastroianni - Dr. Francesco Marchetti
 Marisa Merlini - Mafalda
 Lorella De Luca - Clamide
 Gabriella Pallotta - Pasqua
 Alberto Sordi - Corrado
 Virgilio Riento - Umberto
 Carlo Taranto - Scaraffone
 Ilaria Occhini - Rosina
 Riccardo Garrone - Sergeant
 Giorgio Cerioni - Galeazzo Pesenti
 Gino Buzzanca - Il sindaco di Pianetta

References

External links

Doctor and the Healer at Variety Distribution

1957 films
Films scored by Nino Rota
1950s Italian-language films
1957 comedy films
Italian black-and-white films
Films directed by Mario Monicelli
Medical-themed films
Films with screenplays by Age & Scarpelli
Italian comedy films
1950s Italian films